The "Bridal Chorus" from the 1850 opera Lohengrin by German composer Richard Wagner, who also wrote the libretto, is a march played for the bride's entrance at many formal weddings throughout the Western world. In English-speaking countries, it is generally known as "Here Comes the Bride" or "Wedding March", but "wedding march" refers to any piece in march tempo accompanying the entrance or exit of the bride, notably Felix Mendelssohn's "Wedding March". Wagner’s piece was made popular when it was used as the processional at the wedding of Victoria the Princess Royal to Prince Frederick William of Prussia in 1858.

The chorus is sung in Lohengrin by the women of the wedding party after the ceremony, as they accompany the heroine Elsa to her bridal chamber.


Text
Although at most weddings the chorus is usually played on an organ without singing, in Lohengrin the wedding party sings these words at the beginning of act three.

Eight women then sing a blessing to a separate melody.

The chorus then repeats the first section, gradually proceeding offstage.

Religious attitudes 

Some Christian churches disagree with the use of the "Bridal Chorus" at wedding ceremonies. In an FAQ on the website of the Lutheran Church–Missouri Synod it was explained that opposition to the piece dated from before the First World War, when Lutherans were opposed "to any sort of theater", and Wagner's operas were seen as "depict[ing] pagan stories and themes." A pamphlet issued in 2003 by the Roman Catholic Diocese of San Diego said that the "Bridal Chorus" was "not to be used", again because it is a theatrical piece, but also because it is not a processional to the altar in the opera, and because its frequent use in film and television associate it with sentimentality rather than worship.

Many Jewish couples prefer to choose other music due to the antisemitic views at times espoused by Wagner and his stated lack of respect for Jewish music.

References

Compositions by Richard Wagner
Compositions in B-flat major
March music
Opera excerpts
Wedding songs
Lohengrin